The Association of European Cinematheques (French: Association des Cinémathèques Européennes - ACE) is an affiliation of 49 European national and regional film archives founded in 1991. Its role is to safeguard the European film heritage and make these rich audiovisual records collected and preserved by the various film archives accessible to the public. ACE is a regional branch of FIAF Fédération Internationale des Archives du Film / International Federation of Film Archives. ACE members are non-profit institutions committed to the FIAF Code of Ethics.

History
European film archives have been collecting, preserving, and restoring films and other materials relating to films since the 1930s. The collections range from pre-cinema apparatus to digital cinema files, all of which require specific methods, techniques and an extensive knowledge of film history for preservation.

In 1991, representatives of 31 main European film archives came together to create LUMIERE, a pan-European film restoration project. It was the first large-scale film restoration project funded by the MEDIA I Programme of the European community. The LUMIERE project lasted between 1991 and 1996, during which more than 1000 film titles were preserved and restored, 700 films were re-discovered and identified and a Joint European Filmography (JEF) was established.

ACE started in 1991 as the Association des Cinémathèques de la Communauté Européenne (ACCE). By the end of the LUMIERE project in 1996, the association renamed to its current title, Association des Cinémathèques Européennes (ACE), and established collaboratively its role in raising awareness of the cultural and economic value of European film heritage among policymakers and the audiovisual industry.

Operating on the European level, ACE also represents the interest of its members in the European Union. ACE works to support and improve the economic and legal conditions, as well as technical and scientific research for digitization and long-term film preservation.

ACE members
ACE is an affiliation of 49 national and regional European film archives:

 Eye Filmmuseum, Amsterdam 
 Ταινιοθήκη της Ελλάδος / Greek Film Archive, Athens 
 Filmoteca de Catalunya, Barcelona 
 Filmske novosti, Belgrade 
 Arhiv Jugoslovenske kinoteke / Jugoslav Film Archive, Belgrade 
 Bundesarchiv-Filmarchiv, Berlin 
 Deutsche Kinemathek, Berlin 
 Lichtspiel / Kinemathek Bern, Bern
 Centre national du cinéma, Bois d’Arcy 
 Fondazione Cineteca di Bologna, Bologna
 Cinémathèque royale de Belgique / Koninklijk Belgisch Filmarchief, Brussels 
 Arhiva Nationala de Filme, Bucharest 
 Nemzeti Filmintézet Magyarország – Filmarchívum / National Film Institute Hungary – Film Archive, Budapest 
 Det Danske Filminstitut, Copenhagen 
 Irish Film Institute, Dublin 
 DFF – Deutsches Filminstitut & Filmmuseum, Frankfurt 
 La Cineteca del Friuli, Gemona 
 Kansallinen audiovisuaalinen instituutti / National Audiovisual Institute, Finland, Helsinki 
 Cinémathèque suisse, Lausanne 
 Cinemateca Portuguesa – Museu do Cinema, Lisbon 
 Slovenski filmski arhiv, Ljubljana 
 Slovenska kinoteka / Slovenian Cinematheque, Ljubljana 
 British Film Institute, London 
 Imperial War Museums, London 
 La Cinémathèque de la Ville de Luxembourg, Luxembourg
 Filmoteca Española, Madrid 
 Fondazione Cineteca Italiana, Milan 
 Gosfilmofond, Moscow 
 Filmmuseum München, Münich 
 Nasjonalbiblioteket, Oslo 
 Cinemateket / The Norwegian Film Institute, Oslo 
 La Cinémathèque française, Paris 
 Crnogorska Kinoteka, Podgorica 
 Národní filmový archiv, Prague 
 Cineteca Nazionale, Rome 
 Kinoteka Bosne i Hercegovine, Sarajevo 
 Кинотека на Република Северна Македонија / Cinematheque of the Republic of North Macedonia, Skopje 
 Българска национална филмотека / Bulgarian National Film Archive, Sofia 
 Svenska Filminstitutet, Stockholm 
 Film Archives of the National Archives of Estonia, Tallinn 
 Arkivi Qendror Shtetëror i Filmit (AQSHF) / Albanian National Film Archive, Tirana 
 La Cinémathèque de Toulouse 
 Museo Nazionale del Cinema, Turin 
 Filmoteca Valenciana – Institut Valencià de Cultura, Valencia 
 Filmoteca Vaticana, Vatican 
 Filmarchiv Austria, Vienna 
 Österreichisches Filmmuseum, Vienna 
 Filmoteka Narodowa – Instytut Audiowizualny, Warsaw 
 Hrvatski državni arhiv – Hrvatska kinoteka / Croatian state archive – Croatian cinematheque, Zagreb

Protection of film heritage in Europe
The European Commission directly supports efforts to protect Europe's film heritage. The legal basis for action is Article 167 of the TFEU (Treaty on the Functioning of the European Union), which encourages member states to support the conservation and safeguard of the cultural heritage, including film heritage. The Film Heritage Recommendation 2005 invites the member states to systematically collect, catalogue, preserve, and restore Europe's film heritage.

Projects
ACE has initiated several film heritage projects funded by the European Union:
 LUMIERE (1991–1996), supported by MEDIA I programme.
 All the Colours of the World. Colours in early mass media 1900-1930 (1996–1997). Supported by KALEIDOSCOPE.
Search For Lost Films (1997–1999), supported by RAPHAEL.
 FAOL – Film Archives On Line (1997–2000). Creation of web-based learning tools in the field of film preservation/restoration. Supported by LEONARDO.
 ARCHIMEDIA (1997–2004). European training network for the promotion of cinema heritage, supported by MEDIA II.
FIRST – Film Restoration and Conservation Strategies (2002–2004).  Research project on the application of digital techniques to film heritage. “Film Archives on the Threshold of a Digital Era”: Technical Issues from the EU FIRST Project. FIAF Journal of Film Preservation n° 68, 12/2004. IST - 5th Framework Programme. 
 MIDAS – Moving Image Database for Access and Re-use of European Film Collections (2006–2009). The web portal Filmarchives online gives access to catalogue information from film archives all over Europe.
 EDCINE – Enhanced Digital Cinema (2006–2009): Research and development of applications for storing, managing and distributing digitised archival films (IST 6th Framework Programme).
EN 15744 and EN 15907: Cinematographic works standards on the interoperability of film databases (2005–2010). The standardization work was mandated in 2005 by the European Commission and delegated to CEN (European Committee for Standardization).
 The European Film Gateway (2008–2011). The EFG Portal gives access to digitised films and film related material held in European film archives (eContentplus Programme).
 EFG1914: World War I Film digitisation project (2012–2014), supported by the ICT-Policy Support Programme.
 FORWARD: Framework for an EU wide Audiovisual Orphan Works Registry (2013-2016). The project develops a system for assessing the rights status of audiovisual works and a registry of orphan film compliant to the Directive 2012/28/EU. The project is co-funded by the ICT-Policy Support Programme.
 ABCinema is a joint project of Europeana film archives and film education organisations to share best practices and new approaches in film literacy.
A Season of Classic Films (2019–today): a series of free screenings across Europe to raise awareness of the work of European film archives, with many new digital film restorations presented by the ACE participating film institutions -  supported by the EU Creative Europe programme.
ArteKino Classics (2022-today): a partnership between ARTE and ACE to make European films and cinema history more visible and accessible to greater audiences by presenting a diverse programme of films by European archives.

External links
 ACE website
 FIAF Website
 The European Film Gateway
 FORWARD - Framework for a EU wide Audiovisual Orphan Works Registry
 ABCinema Project
 A Season of Classic Films
 Digital Agenda for Europe – Protection of the Film Heritage

References

Cultural organizations based in Europe

Cultural heritage of Europe
Film organisations in Belgium
Film preservation organizations
Film preservation
FIAF-affiliated institutions